DNA (deoxyribonucleic acid) is a molecule encoding the genetic instructions for life.

DNA may also refer to:

Companies
 DNA Films, a British film studio
 DNA Oyj, a Finnish telecommunications company
 DNA Productions, an American animation studio
 DNA Publications, an American publishing company
 DNA Studio, an advertising agency
 Ginkgo Bioworks, a biotech company with stock symbol DNA

Computing
 DIGITAL Network Architecture, DECnet's peer-to-peer networking architecture
 BitTorrent DNA, a download accelerator
 Windows DNA, a defunct predecessor of the Microsoft  Framework
 Direct Note Access, technology for music editing from Celemony Software

Film and television
 DNA (1997 film), an American science fiction action film
 DNA (2020 film), a French drama film
 "DNA" (Red Dwarf), a 1991 episode of Red Dwarf
 DNA (British TV series), a British television crime drama
 DNA (Danish TV series), a 2019 Danish television crime drama with Anders W. Berthelsen as policeman Rolf Larsen

Literature
 Daily News and Analysis, an Indian broadsheet newspaper that is now an online news site
 DNA Magazine an Australian monthly magazine
 Les Dernières Nouvelles d'Alsace or Les DNA, a daily French newspaper
 DNA, a 2008 book by Dennis Kelly
 DnA, the joint pen name of Dan Abnett and Andy Lanning, British comic book writing duo

Music

Bands
 DNA (American band), a No Wave band
 DNA (duo), an electronic dance music duo
 DNA, a rock band formed in 1983 by Rick Derringer and Carmine Appice
 DNA, a Kazakh boy group under Juz Entertainment

Albums
 DNA (Backstreet Boys album) (2019)
 DNA (Wanessa Camargo album) (2011)
 DNA (Last Live at CBGB's) 1993 album by DNA
 D.N.A. (John Foxx album) (2010)
 DNA (Koda Kumi album) (2018)
 DNA (Little Mix album) (2012)
 D.N.A. (Mario album) (2009)
 DNA (Matthew Shipp and William Parker album) (1999)
 DNA (Trapt album) (2016)
 DNA (Ian Yates album) (2014)
 DNA (Ghali album) (2020)
 DNA, a 2019 album by Jeanette Biedermann

Songs
 "DNA" (BTS song) (2017)
 "DNA" (Empire of the Sun song) (2013)
 "D.N.A." (A Flock of Seagulls song) (1982)
 "DNA" (Kendrick Lamar song) (2017)
 "DNA" (Little Mix song) (2012)
 "DNA", a song by Danny Brown from XXX
 "DNA", a song by the Kills from Blood Pressures
 "DNA", a song by Rye Rye from Go! Pop! Bang!
 "DNA", a song by Wale from Shine

Politics and government
 Democratic National Assembly, a political party in Trinidad and Tobago
  or Norwegian Labour Party
 The National Assembly or De Nationale Assemblée, the parliament of Suriname

Other uses
 DNa inscription, an ancient inscription at the tomb of Darius the Great
 DNA Lounge, a nightclub in San Francisco, California, U.S.
 Dynamic network analysis, a scientific field in sociology and statistics
 Dynamic New Athletics, a team competition format in athletics
 DNA, an index herbariorum code in the FloraNT database
 Did Not Attend, a motorsport term

See also
 Corporate DNA, factors underlying and affecting organizational culture
 DeNA, mobile provider in Japan
 DNA computing, a field of non-silicon computing technologies based on molecular biology
 DNA profiling
 DNA², a 1993 manga by Masakazu Katsura, subsequently adapted into an anime
 D.N.Angel, a 2003 manga/anime franchise by Yukiru Sugisaki
 DNAR or "Do not attempt resuscitation", legal order to withhold cardiopulmonary resuscitation (CPR) or cardiac life support
 Z-DNA, one of the possible double helical structures of DNA